2023 Pakistan Super League (also known as PSL 8 or, for sponsorship reasons, HBL PSL 2023) was the eighth season of the Pakistan Super League, a franchise Twenty20 cricket league which was established by the Pakistan Cricket Board (PCB) in 2015. Then PCB chairman Ramiz Raja had hinted at an auction based system to replace the draft for the 2023 season but a draft was retained. The draft for the tournament was held on 15 December in Karachi. A total of 36 foreign players were picked alongside local players. Lahore Qalandars were the defending champions.

This Tournament was filled with several controversies:

Sponsoring of Betting Companies: Former Pakistan cricketers such as Rashid Latif, have slammed the Pakistan Cricket Board (PCB) for allowing domestic teams and PSL franchises of HBL PSL to sign betting companies as a sponsor such as 1XBAT(1xBet), Wolf777News, MCW Sports(MCW Casino), MEL Bat(MEL Bet), Dafa news (Dafabet) with a surrogate brand name of betting websites, which was illegal in Pakistan. 

State Bank of Pakistan (SBP) also slammed PCB and asked to investigate the issue of betting sites and cryptocurrencies being advertised as official sponsors of the PSL.“Asif Afridi banned from all cricket for two years! On one hand, players are banned for corruption but betting companies are encouraged as sponsors to domestic teams/events by cricket authorities,” tweeted Latif []. But the PCB representative denied these allegations. 

Stolen Equipment: As many as eight CCTV high resolution cameras, fibre cables and generator batteries have been stolen from the Gaddafi Stadium, Lahore during the ongoing Pakistan Super League, as per local news reports.
Notably, the incident came in the backdrop of the Punjab government and the Pakistan Cricket Board (PCB) being at loggerheads. The issue driving the wedge is the division of money for the security of the matches in Lahore and Rawalpindi. Off the $1.9 million (PKR 500 million) required to make security arrangements at the venue or the tournament, the Punjab government is only willing to shell out $970,000 (PKR 250 million). It wasn't the remaining 50 percent amount to be covered by the PCB which has refused to do so. 

The tournament was to be played between 13 February to 19 March 2023,  However on 16 March 2023, PCB moved forward the Final by a day to 18 March 2023 due to bad forecast predicted in Lahore, with 19 and 20 March set as reserve days respectively.

In the final, Lahore Qalandars defeated Multan Sultans with a minor margin of 1 run to win their consecutive 2nd title of the tournament.

Squads

In November 2022, the retained player's list was announced. Squads for the tournament were finalized on 15 December with the final draft.

Venues
The Pakistan Cricket Board announced plans to hold matches in Multan, Peshawar, Lahore and Karachi during the 2023 season. Lahore and Karachi were only the venues in 2022. The Arbab Niaz Stadium in Peshawar was declared unfit to hold any matches in the tournament. Quetta's Bugti Stadium was later added to the list of PSL venues but was removed shortly after due to logistical reasons. The PCB considered moving the matches in Lahore and Rawalpindi to Karachi after a dispute with the Punjab government over the cost of security arrangements but did not do so after the dispute was resolved.

Match officials 
On 7 February, PCB announced the list of officials for league stage matches which included 3 Elite Panel of ICC Umpires out of 14.

Umpires 

Ahsan Raza
Aleem Dar
Alex Wharf
Asif Yaqoob
Faisal Afridi
Martin Saggers
Michael Gough
Mohammad Asif
Nasir Hussain
Rashid Riaz
Richard Illingworth
Ruchira Palliyaguruge
Shozab Raza
Tariq Rasheed

Referees 

Ali Naqvi
Iftikhar Ahmed
Muhammad Javed
Mohammad Anees
Roshan Mahanama

Marketing 

The season's logo variant was unveiled on 26 January with the hashtags #HBLPSL8 and #SabSitarayHamaray being used for promotion on social media; latter being the official anthem. Previously, the slogan for this season had been 'Soch Hai Apki' but was later changed.

Trophy 
The trophy for this season, named Supernova, was unveiled on 9 February 2023. It was entirely made in Pakistan by Lahore-based Mahfooz Jewellers.

Media personnel 
PCB revealed the names of media personnel on 7 February.

Commentary Panel 

Alan Wilkins
Bazid Khan
Danny Morrison
Daren Ganga
Dominic Cork
Mark Butcher
Marina Iqbal (Urdu commentator)
Nick Knight
Sana Mir
Sikandar Bakht
Simon Doull
Tariq Saeed (Urdu commentator)
Urooj Mumtaz
Vernon Philander
Waqar Younis

Presenters 
Erin Holland
Zainab Abbas

League Stage

Format 
Each team played every other team twice in the league stage of the tournament in a double round robin. Following the group stage, the top four teams qualified for the playoff stage of the tournament.

Points table

Summary

League progression

Fixtures 
The PCB announced the fixtures on 20 January 2023. An exhibition match was played between Peshawar Zalmi and Quetta Gladiators before the start of league at the Bugti Stadium and was won by the Gladiators by 3 runs.

Karachi and Multan

Lahore and Rawalpindi

Playoffs

Qualifier

Eliminators

Eliminator 1

Eliminator 2

Final

Awards and statistics 
Abbas Afridi, the leading wicket taker of the tournament, was awarded with the Fazal Mahmood Cap, and Mohammad Rizwan, leading runs scorer, was awarded with the Hanif Mohammad Cap.

Most runs

Most wickets

References

External links
 League home at ESPNcricinfo
	

2023 Pakistan Super League
2023 in Pakistani cricket
February 2023 events in Pakistan
March 2023 events in Pakistan